Phanerodontia is a genus of four species of crust fungi in the family Phanerochaetaceae. The genus was circumscribed by mycologists Kurt Hjortstam and Leif Ryvarden in 2010 with Phanerodontia dentata as the type species.

Species
Phanerodontia chrysosporium (Burds.) Hjortstam & Ryvarden (2010)
Phanerodontia dentata Hjortstam & Ryvarden (2010)
Phanerodontia irpicoides (Hjortstam) Hjortstam & Ryvarden (2010)
Phanerodontia magnoliae (Berk. & M.A.Curtis) Hjortstam & Ryvarden (2010)

References

Taxa described in 2010
Phanerochaetaceae
Polyporales genera
Taxa named by Leif Ryvarden